Sodwana Bay National Park, is a park situated on the north eastern coast of KwaZulu-Natal, South Africa; it is located within the iSimangaliso Wetland Park World Heritage Site 20 minutes away from local town Mbazwana. This park is known for sport fishing, scuba diving and snorkelling. 

It is abundantly rich in a variety of fish species, fauna and flora covering the coastal area of about 240km and includes an inland area of about 332 000 ha. This is a tourism sustained community, generating most of its income from international tourist visitors and a good number of local tourists provided accommodation from the nearby hotels, resorts, Bed and Breakfasts, diving centres, camps, and lodges.

Due to its rich biodiversity, it invites a great deal of researchers and hosts a few events from fishing competitions to beach concerts. 

In summer, loggerhead and leatherback turtles come out of the sea to nest on the beaches.

See also

References 

Ezemvelo KZN Wildlife Parks
National parks of South Africa